Alex Michael Jennings (born 10 May 1957) is an English actor of the stage and screen, who worked extensively with the Royal Shakespeare Company and National Theatre. For his work on the London stage, Jennings received three Olivier Awards, winning for Too Clever by Half (1988), Peer Gynt (1996), and My Fair Lady (2003). He is the only performer to have won Olivier awards in the drama, musical, and comedy categories.

He is known for his film work, in particular for his performance as Prince Charles in Stephen Frears' film The Queen (2006) opposite Helen Mirren. His other film appearances include The Wings of the Dove (1997), Bridget Jones: The Edge of Reason (2004), Babel (2006), Belle (2013), and The Lady in the Van (2015) starring Maggie Smith.

Jennings won acclaim for his performances in television including for his portrayal of Edward VIII, the Duke of Windsor, in the Netflix series The Crown acting opposite Claire Foy. He also starred in the ITV series Victoria (2016–2019) opposite Jenna Coleman, as well as Stephen Frears' A Very English Scandal (2018) alongside Hugh Grant and Ben Whishaw, and most recently Steve McQueen's Small Axe: Mangrove (2020) starring Letitia Wright.

Early life 
Jennings was born in Romford, Essex, the son of Peggy Patricia (née Mahoney) and Michael Thomas Jennings. He attended Abbs Cross Technical High School in Hornchurch and studied English and Theatre studies at the University of Warwick, graduating in 1978. He said he saw his first theatre while in high school and went to the Old Vic Theatre, which inspired him to be an actor.

He trained as an actor for two years at the Bristol Old Vic Theatre School.

Career

1980s
In the early 1980s, Jennings began his career in regional repertory theatre. In 1985, playing a range of roles including Maximilien Robespierre in The Scarlet Pimpernel. Jennings met director Nicholas Hytner during this production and has worked with him many times since. For his performance as Gloumov in Too Clever by Half at the Old Vic, he won the Olivier Award for Best Comedy Performance in 1988. He was nominated in the same category the following year for portraying Dorante in The Liar. He has performed for the Royal National Theatre in a number of plays, including Leontes in The Winter's Tale and the title role in Albert Speer.

Jennings' work in television includes appearances in The State Within, Smiley's People, The Franchise Affair, Inspector Morse, Lewis, Alfonso Bonzo, the title role in Ashenden, Dead Poets Society, Inspector Alleyn, Hard Times, Bad Blood, and Peter Ackroyd's London. His many radio credits include Casino Royale, The Way of the World, Strange Meeting, Vorbis in Small Gods, and The Old Curiosity Shop.

1990s
His Royal Shakespeare Company roles include the title role in Peer Gynt (for which he won an Olivier Award 1995-06 for Best Actor), the title role in Richard II (opposite Anton Lesser as Henry Bolingbroke), Theseus/Oberon in A Midsummer Night's Dream (UK, American tour and Broadway), Angelo in Measure for Measure, and the title role in Hamlet.

He also appeared in War Requiem, the RSC's film version of A Midsummer Night's Dream, and Joseph and the Amazing Technicolor Dreamcoat (1999). Jennings also appeared as Lord Mark in the romantic drama film The Wings of the Dove starring Helena Bonham Carter, Elizabeth McGovern, Charlotte Rampling, and Sir Michael Gambon. The film received great acclaim and many awards nominations including four Academy Award nominations and five British Academy Film Award nominations.

2000s
In 2002, he appeared in the Cameron Mackintosh/Trevor Nunn revival of My Fair Lady at the Theatre Royal, Drury Lane and won an Olivier Award as Best Actor in a Musical. He was an Associate Artist at the Royal Shakespeare Company. That year he also appeared in The Four Feathers (2002) as Colonel Hamilton alongside Heath Ledger, Kate Hudson, and Michael Sheen.

In 2006, Jennings' made his breakthrough film role as Charles, Prince of Wales opposite Helen Mirren as Queen Elizabeth II in The Queen. The film was directed by Stephen Frears, and written by Peter Morgan. The film depicts the death of Diana, Princess of Wales on 31 August 1997 and the reaction from the British public and the British royal family. The film was an immense critical and box office success after it premiered at the Venice Film Festival. The film received six Academy Award nominations including a win for Mirren's performance.

In 2007, he played the role of Garry Essendine in Noël Coward's Present Laughter at the NT. Also in 2007, he portrayed the Rev. Hutton in the BBC miniseries Cranford starring Judi Dench. He also played John Le Mesurier in the one-off BBC drama Hancock and Joan. In 2009, he appeared in The Habit of Art as Benjamin Britten.

In June 2008, he made his debut in the Operetta at the ENO in Robert Carsen's production of Bernstein's Candide, in which he played Voltaire and Doctor Pangloss.

He has recorded the audio versions of the books: Sins of the Father by Jeffrey Archer, The Kraken Wakes by John Wyndham, The Horse and His Boy, Out of the Silent Planet, and Perelandra by C.S. Lewis, 20,000 Leagues Under the Sea by Jules Verne, and Attention All Shipping by Charlie Connelly, which was selected in June 2008 as one of the top 40 audiobooks of all time. In 2006, he recorded an abridgement of A Spot of Bother by Mark Haddon. He is also a regular narrator on BBC Radio 4's Book at Bedtime. He was also a member of the BBC's Radio Drama Company.

2010s
In 2010, he played Captain Shipshape in the CBeebies second series of Grandpa in my Pocket and starred in the film Belle. After that, he played Henry Tizard in Castles in the Sky.
In 2011, he played Mikhail Bulgakov in the National Theatre's production of Collaborators. In 2014, he played the role of Willy Wonka in Charlie and the Chocolate Factory the Musical, which was directed by Sam Mendes and was performed on London's West End theatre district. He took over the role from Douglas Hodge in 2014.

From 2011 to 2014, Jennings played Alan Cowdrey QC in the BBC One legal drama Silk. He has also appeared in the PBS/Masterpiece Theatre television series Inspector Lewis (2012), and Foyle's War (2015).

Jennings portrayed playwright Alan Bennett in the 2015 film The Lady in the Van opposite Academy Award winner Dame Maggie Smith in the title role. The film is directed by Nicolas Hytner, who is a long-time collaborator from the theatre. The film also featured performances from Jim Broadbent, Claire Foy, Frances de la Tour, and James Corden. The film premiered at the 2015 Toronto International Film Festival to great acclaim, specifically for Smith's performance. To promote the film Maggie Smith, and Jennings, appeared on The Graham Norton Show, this is Smith's first chat show appearance in over 40 years.

In 2016, he reprised his role as Professor Henry Higgins in the Australian 60th anniversary production of My Fair Lady, directed by Julie Andrews.

On television, from 2016 to 2017, he appeared in the Netflix series The Crown alongside Claire Foy and Jared Harris, as Prince Edward, Duke of Windsor, uncle to Queen Elizabeth and great-uncle to Prince Charles (whom Jennings played in The Queen). The series has received widespread acclaim from audiences and critics alike. Jennings also portrayed King Leopold I of Belgium in the ITV/PBS series Victoria (2016–2019) alongside Jenna Coleman.

In 2018 he played Liberal MP Peter Bessell in the BBC One series, A Very English Scandal alongside Hugh Grant, and Ben Whishaw, a miniseries about the Jeremy Thorpe affair directed by Stephen Frears. The film received widespread critical acclaim with a 97% on Rotten Tomatoes with the critics consensus reading, "Hugh Grant and Ben Whishaw impress in A Very English Scandal, an equally absorbing and appalling look at British politics and society". The series also received four Primetime Emmy Award nominations including a win for Whishaw for his performance.

In 2019, he played Andrew Aldridge, a Conservative MP, in the TV miniseries Four Weddings and a Funeral

2020s
In 2020, Jennings appeared in the Small Axe miniseries directed by Steve McQueen, specifically the television movie, Mangrove as Judge Edward Clarke alongside Letitia Wright as physician and British Black Panther Altheia Jones-LeCointe. In Mangrove, the story revolves around the true story based on the Mangrove Nine who were British black activists tried for inciting a riot at a protest, in 1970, against the police targeting of the Mangrove restaurant, Notting Hill, in West London. The film received widespread critical acclaim, with the critics consensus on Rotten Tomatoes reading, "Anchored by strong performances and an even stronger sense of conviction, Mangrove is a powerful indictment of institutional racism."

Work

Film

Television

Theatre 

Filmed Theatrical Events

 1999: Joseph and the Amazing Technicolor Dreamcoat as Butler
 2010: National Theatre Live: The Habit of Art as Henry / Benjamin Britten
 2011: National Theatre Live: Collaborators as Mikhail Bulgakov
 2013: National Theatre Live: 50 Years on Stage as Henry Higgins
 2019: National Theatre Live: Hansard as Robin Hesketh

Awards and nominations

References

External links 
 
 

1957 births
Living people
Alumni of Bristol Old Vic Theatre School
Alumni of the University of Warwick
Critics' Circle Theatre Award winners
English male film actors
English male musical theatre actors
English male radio actors
English male stage actors
English male television actors
Male actors from Essex
National Youth Theatre members
Laurence Olivier Award winners
People from Romford
Royal Shakespeare Company members
English male Shakespearean actors